Mid America Motorplex, now renamed Raceway Park of the Midlands (RPM), is an Alan Wilson-designed road circuit in the Omaha – Council Bluffs metropolitan area, in Plattville Township, Mills County, just outside Pacific Junction, Iowa. This facility includes a 2.23 mile road course and a 1/8-mile drag strip, known as I29 Dragway. It is a relatively safe track for people to learn to drive their cars at high-performance driving events.

There is a motorbike school at the track as well as most local car clubs such as the PCA-run driving education sessions and BMW Iowa Chapter driving schools.

Mid-America Motorplex has also served as a concert venue. It served as the venue for River Riot 2012, hosted by KIWR, which featured Incubus, Shinedown, Five Finger Death Punch, After the Fall and Emphatic. It also served as the venue for Knotfest on August 17, 2012, which featured Slipknot, Deftones, and Serj Tankian.

References

External links
Track home page
Trackpedia guide to driving this track
1tail Resource Database: Mid-America Motorplex
High Rev Driving School

Buildings and structures in Mills County, Iowa
Motorsport venues in Iowa
Music venues in Iowa
Tourist attractions in Mills County, Iowa